The John Gorton Building, also referred to as the Gorton Building and formerly the Administrative Building, is a heritage listed government office located within the Parliamentary Triangle in Canberra, Australia. The office building is the administrative headquarters of the Department of Climate Change, Energy, the Environment and Water.

Planned in 1924, designed in 1946 and completed in 1956, the Administrative Building is significant as a good Canberra example of the Inter-war Stripped Classical style. Key features of this style displayed by the building include: the symmetrical facades; the division of the elevations into vertical bays; the occasional use of correct Classical details; the use of a basic Classical column form; the expressed portico; the simple surface treatments; and subdued spandrels between the storeys which emphasise verticality. Design elements which retain a high level of integrity include the exterior, foyers, lift lobbies and central corridors.

The Administrative Building is also part of the significant cultural landscape of the Parliamentary triangle. It occupies a prominent and strategic location flanking the land axis in accordance with the 1916 Griffin plan. Together with the later Treasury Building balancing its mass across the central lawns of the land axis, the Administrative Building contributes to the planned aesthetic qualities of the Parliamentary triangle. The building was listed on the Commonwealth Heritage List on 22 June 2004.

History 
The building was first planned 1924, with construction breaking ground soon after in 1927. However, due to budgetary constraints and substandard foundation construction, the project was delayed indefinitely. It took until 1946 for construction to begin, designed in the Inter-war Stripped Classical style. It took a further ten years for the building to finally open in 1956. The entire construction project took place in the context of a large post-war expansion effort within Canberra.

When the office building was first opened, it was occupied by the News and Information Bureau, the Department of the Interior, the Department of Health, and the Department of External Affairs (DEA). The DEA and succeeding departments remained the building's primary occupant up until the late 1990s when the Department of Finance moved in. In 1999 the building was renamed to the John Gorton Building, after Australia's 19th prime minister, John Gorton.

Bunker 
In 1974, construction began on a communications centre for the Department of Foreign Affairs (previously the Department of External Affairs), who were now the primary occupant of the building following an expansion during the cold war. The existing structure did not have the security nor space to house the communications equipment. In order to prevent spying and protect against foreign attacks, it was constructed with steel lined walls and a concrete super structure. Despite being often referred to as a "bunker", it is not nor has it ever been a bunker.

By 2000, due to the modernization of the computer systems and their subsequent move to the main structure, the bunker was abandoned for several years. In 2003, the bunker was renovated and turned into office space for the newly occupying Department of Finance and remains in use today.

Despite the fact the existence of the bunker has always been public knowledge and today is openly visible from the outside, the bunker is the subject of urban legend in Canberra to this day, being speculated to be in several different locations.

See also 

 Australian non-residential architectural styles

References

Attribution

Bibliography 
 

Office buildings in Canberra
Landmarks in Canberra
Commonwealth Heritage List places in the Australian Capital Territory
1956 establishments in Australia
Government buildings completed in 1956
Neoclassical architecture in Australia